Anna Lehr (November 17, 1890 – January 22, 1974) was an American silent film and stage actress.

Biography
Born in New York City to Austrian immigrant parents, Frank Lehr and Emilie Freisinger, Anna Lehr filmed Civilization's Child (1916) for Thomas Ince, a Triangle-Kay Bee feature. The screenplay was written by C. Gardner Sullivan. There is a scene in which Russian cavalry charge over her as she lies prostrate on the ground. Lehr's fear was abated somewhat by her belief that horses will not step on people except by accident. She played "Doris Ames" in the silent film Grafters (1917), which was directed by Allan Dwan.

In 1919 Lehr was chosen by David Powell to play in Teeth of the Tiger. She was forced to withdraw due to ptomaine poisoning. The movie was being filmed by Famous Players-Lasky in New York City. Lehr's continued absence necessitated the retaking of scenes which she had completed.

She was sued by Chappell, Inc., in 1921 for nonpayment of $916.85 worth of hats, gowns, and cloaks. Lehr testified that she had intended to pay for the merchandise but delayed after a sheriff and collectors began bothering her. Chappell contended that when she did not return to their store to make arrangements for payment, they had a right to send out to collect the amount owed them. Her attorney sought dismissal of the case on the grounds that Edwin McKim was made a party to the suit, but had not been served; McKim was in New York City at the time. The case was carried out in the Los Angeles, California court of Judge J.P. Wood.

Family
She was married to Edwin McKim; their daughter was actress Ann Dvorak. The couple divorced when Dvorak was nine or ten years old, and she and her father had no contact with each other for nearly 14 years. She finally reconnected with him "through a newspaper appeal" in 1934.

Death
 
Lehr died in Santa Monica, California, aged 83, in 1974, predeceasing her daughter, Ann Dvorak, by only five years.

Partial filmography

References

External links

Anna Lehr Gallery at Ann Dvorak.com
Later photo of Ann Lehr with Nat Sherman and Hedda Hopper

1890 births
1974 deaths
American people of Austrian descent
American stage actresses
American film actresses
American silent film actresses
Actresses from New York City
20th-century American actresses